SpongeBob's Big Birthday Blowout is a 2019 made-for-television live-action/animated comedy special based on the American animated television series SpongeBob SquarePants. It was written by Kaz and Mr. Lawrence, and was directed by Jonas Morganstein. The special, produced as part of the show's twelfth season, originally aired on Nickelodeon in the United States on July 12, 2019, celebrating the series' twentieth anniversary.

The television series follows the adventures of SpongeBob SquarePants (voiced by Tom Kenny) in the underwater city of Bikini Bottom. In the special, the citizens of Bikini Bottom plan a surprise birthday party for SpongeBob, while he and Patrick Star (voiced by Bill Fagerbakke) tour the surface world and come across their real-life selves. The live-action portions of the special also feature several guest stars including Kel Mitchell, Jack Griffo, Daniella Perkins, and David Hasselhoff, the latter of whom starred as himself in The SpongeBob SquarePants Movie. The special is dedicated to the memory of SpongeBob creator Stephen Hillenburg, who died from complications of ALS in 2018. Upon release, it received generally positive reviews.

Plot
In Encino, California, Patchy the Pirate attempts to get to Bikini Bottom to give SpongeBob SquarePants his birthday present. Down in Bikini Bottom, Sandy Cheeks gathers Patrick Star, Old Man Walker, Mr. Krabs, Mrs. Puff, Bubble Bass, and Plankton to orchestrate a plan to get SpongeBob's house keys and decorate his house, starting with Patrick. Patrick sends SpongeBob to a bus going to the surface, with help landing by the French Narrator.

At SpongeBob's house, an argument occurs about the Birthday theme. Sandy gives everyone (now joined by Squidward Tentacles) a decision to divide the themes. The party goes through full swing, but chaos ensues and the house starts falling apart. Arriving at the Trusty Slab on the surface, SpongeBob notices that a customer, the cashier Manward, the owner Mr. Slabs and the Fry cook JimBob appear as respective human counterparts to Patrick, Squidward, Mr. Krabs and himself. A lady mistakes the tour bus for an aquarium, and puts it on a shelf in a fish store.

Patrick pushes the tour bus to the other side, escaping with the other fish. In Bikini Bottom, SpongeBob discovers his destroyed house and thanks everyone for celebrating his birthday, when a Box falls out of the sky. The Box is revealed to be Patchy's head, congratulating SpongeBob, leading SpongeBob's friends to sing a birthday song reminiscent of the opening theme with different celebrities congratulating him. As the song finishes, Patrick asks SpongeBob how old he is, just to be interrupted by static.

Cast

Voices
 Tom Kenny as SpongeBob SquarePants, Old Man Walker, Gary, French Narrator, SpongeBob's Dad, Peter Lorre Fish, Grubby Grouper
 Bill Fagerbakke as Patrick Star, Bus Passenger, Passenger, Patron #1
 Rodger Bumpass as Squidward Tentacles, Bus Passenger, Announcer, Yellow Fish
 Clancy Brown as Eugene Krabs, Unhappy Guy, Party Guest #2
 Carolyn Lawrence as Sandy Cheeks, Bus Passenger, Little Girl
 Mr. Lawrence as Sheldon Plankton, Potty the Parrot, Rube, Larry, Fred
 Jill Talley as Karen, Office Middle Management
 Lori Alan as Pearl 
 Dee Bradley Baker as Bubble Bass, Dog, Alarm Clock, Cow
 Mary Jo Catlett as Mrs. Puff
 Sirena Irwin as SpongeBob's Mom, Gawky Female, The Kid
 Frank Caeti as Gorilla Boss
 Ephraim López as Monkey Middle Manager
 Cory DeMeyers as Monkey Middle Manager
 Lana McKissack as Monkey Middle Manager
 Sydney Olson as Monkey Middle Manager

Live-action cast
 Tom Kenny as Patchy the Pirate, JimBob
 Bill Fagerbakke as Patrick
 Rodger Bumpass as Manward
 Clancy Brown as Mr. Slabs
 Carolyn Lawrence as Carol
 Mr. Lawrence as Charleston
 Jill Talley as Office Middle Management
 Lori Alan as Pet Shop Woman
 Dee Bradley Baker as Bald Guy
 Sirena Irwin as Office Worker
 David Hasselhoff as himself
 Kel Mitchell as Beans McBeans, himself
 Dahlya Glick as Can
 Jack Griffo as Contestant
 Daniella Perkins as Contestant
 JoJo Siwa as herself
 Tiffany Haddish as herself
 Thomas F. Wilson as Dog Walker, Himself
 Sigourney Weaver as herself
 Heidi Klum as herself
 Kal Penn as himself
 Lana Condor as herself (original airings)
 John Goodman as himself (alternate airings)
 Jason Sudeikis as himself
 RuPaul as himself
 Vernon Davis as himself
 Rob Gronkowski as himself
 Ethan Slater as himself
 Danny Skinner as himself
 Lilli Cooper as herself
 Gilbert Gottfried as himself

Broadcast and reception

Viewership
SpongeBob's Big Birthday Blowout premiered on July 12, 2019, simultaneously across Nickelodeon, and Nicktoons. The three-network premiere was collectively viewed by 2.2 million people in the United States, and it posted year-to-year gains for the network across multiple demographics, most notably, kids ages 2–11 (3.3/797K, +57%). The special's premiere date is notable for taking place five days before the 20th anniversary of the series' official premiere, which took place on July 17, 1999.

It aired in other territories on July 12 and July 13, 2019, Tom Kenny's 57th birthday.

Reception
Verne Gay from Newsday gave the episode 3.5 out of 4 stars, describing it as "[f]un, funny, and funky".

See also
SpongeBob's Truth or Square

References

External links
 

SpongeBob SquarePants
SpongeBob SquarePants episodes
2019 television films
2019 films
2019 animated films
2010s American animated films
American fantasy comedy films
American television films
American children's animated adventure films
American children's animated comedy films
Animated films based on animated series
Nickelodeon animated films
Surreal comedy films
American films with live action and animation
Television episodes about birthdays
American slapstick comedy films
Anniversary television episodes
2019 comedy films